The Drug, Healthcare and Patient Safety is a peer-reviewed healthcare journal covering patient safety issues. It was established in 2009 and is published by Dove Medical Press. The journal is abstracted and indexed in EMBASE and Scopus.

External links 
 

English-language journals
Open access journals
Dove Medical Press academic journals
Publications established in 2009
Public health journals